Malval (Limousin: Malaval) is a former commune in the Creuse department in the Nouvelle-Aquitaine region in central France. On 1 January 2019, it was merged into the new commune Linard-Malval.

Geography

Population

Sights
 The church of St. Valérie, dating from the twelfth century.
 The ruins of a fourteenth-century castle.
 A restored watermill.

See also
Communes of the Creuse department

References

External links
 Malval on the Quid website 

Former communes of Creuse
Populated places disestablished in 2019